Universe is the sixth extended play by South Korean–Chinese boy band Exo. It was released by SM Entertainment on December 26, 2017.

Release
On December 14, 2017, Exo was announced to be releasing their sixth extended play and fourth "winter special" album titled Universe on December 21. Following the death of South Korean singer and Exo's labelmate Jonghyun, a member of SHINee, the album's release was postponed. Universe and the music video for its title track were instead released on December 26, 2017.

Single
The lead single "Universe" debuted at number one on the Melon Realtime Chart. "Universe", produced by Shin Hyuk and MRey, is described as a rock ballad that talks about how a person will search the universe just to find their lover. The single debuted at number two on the South Korean Gaon Digital Chart. It also topped the Billboard Korea Kpop Hot 100 for the first week of 2018.

Promotion
Exo performed "Universe" for the first time on December 31 on MBC's year-end show, MBC Gayo Daejejeon.

Reception
Upon release, Universe was praised by fans for using gender-neutral pronouns such as "me" and "you" instead of "he" and "she" in the lyrics.

Commercial performance
The album debuted atop the South Korean Gaon Album Chart and at number two on the Billboard World Albums Chart.

Track listing
Credits adapted from Naver, iTunes and ASCAP.

Charts

Weekly charts

Monthly charts

Year-end charts

Sales

Awards and nominations

Music program awards

Release history

References

SM Entertainment EPs
Genie Music EPs
Korean-language EPs
2017 EPs
Christmas albums by South Korean artists
Exo EPs